The Taunton Silverplate Company, also known as the Taunton Silver Plate Company, was an American manufacturing company active in Taunton, Massachusetts from 1853 to 1859. Some form of the company was reconstituted c. 1872-1874 with its showroom at 4 Maiden Lane, New York City, with Oliver Ames as president and George T. Atwood as treasurer. The Brooklyn Daily Eagle of December 16, 1874, advertises the firm auctioning off their showroom and all stock. At some point, probably circa 1880, the firm was purchased by I.J. Steane.

Notes

References 
 Expressman's Monthly, Volume 1, Bonnell, 1876, pages 147-148.
 Encyclopedia of American Silver Manufacturers, Dorothy T. Rainwater, Judy Redfield, Schiffer Pub., 1998, page 333.
 "Taunton Silverplate Company", Silver Salon Forums.
 "Taunton Silverplate Company", American Silverplate Marks.
 "Taunton Silverplate Company", Online Encyclopedia of Silver Marks, Hallmarks, and Makers' Marks.
 "Taunton Silverplate Company", Sterling Silverware Fashions.

American silversmiths
Taunton, Massachusetts